Coolidge is a surname.

Notable people and characters with the surname include:

People
 Archibald Cary Coolidge (1866–1928), American history professor and diplomat
 Calvin Coolidge (1872–1933), 30th president of the United States
 Calvin Coolidge Jr. (1908–1924), second and youngest son of President Calvin Coolidge
 Calvin Galusha Coolidge (1815–1878), American politician and farmer
 Cassius Marcellus Coolidge (1844–1934), American painter
 Charles A. Coolidge (1844–1926), American army general
 Charles Allerton Coolidge (1858–1936), American architect
 Charles H. Coolidge (1921–2021), American army soldier
 Clark Coolidge (born 1939), American poet
 Eliska Haskova Coolidge (born 1941 as Eliška Hašková), Czech American assistant at the White House and the U.S. Department of State
 Elizabeth Sprague Coolidge, American pianist and patron of music, especially of chamber music.
 Grace Coolidge (1879–1957), wife of Calvin Coolidge and First Lady of the United States from 1923 to 1929
 Harold Jefferson Coolidge Jr. (1904–1985), American primatologist
 Harold Jefferson Coolidge Sr. (1870–1934), American lawyer and author
 Harriet Abbott Lincoln Coolidge (1849–1902), American author, philanthropist, reformer
 Jennifer Coolidge (born 1961), American actress
 John Coolidge (1906–2000), businessman, first son of President Calvin Coolidge
 John Calvin Coolidge Sr. (1845–1926), American politician and businessman
 John Coolidge Adams (born 1947), American minimalist composer
 John Gardner Coolidge (1863–1936), American diplomat
 Julian Coolidge (1873–1954), American mathematician
 Marcus A. Coolidge (1865–1947), US Senator from Massachusetts
 Martha Coolidge (born 1946), American film director
 Mary Roberts Coolidge (1860–1945), American sociologist 
 Peggy Stuart Coolidge (1913–1981), American composer
 Philip Coolidge (1908-1967), American actor
 Rita Coolidge (born 1945), American music star
 Susan Coolidge (1835–1905), American children's author, pen name of Sarah Chauncey Woolsey
 William D. Coolidge (1873–1975), American physicist
 W. A. B. Coolidge (1850–1926), American historian, theologian, and mountaineer

Fictional Characters
 Butch Coolidge, character in the 1994 film Pulp Fiction
 Senel Coolidge, the main character in the Japanese RPG Tales of Legendia

English-language surnames